Region 8 of the National Junior College Athletic Association comprises at least 26 community and state colleges from the Florida college system. All members of the NJCAA Region 8 are Division I, excluding Pasco–Hernando State College, which is in Division II.  The colleges athletics are collectively administered by the Florida College System Activities Association (FCSAA), with the exception of ASA College of Miami, which is a private institution.

Members

Mid-Florida Conference
 Daytona State College
 Florida State College at Jacksonville
 College of Central Florida
 Lake-Sumter State College
 Santa Fe College
 St. Johns River State College
 Seminole State College

Panhandle Conference
 Chipola College
 Gulf Coast State College
 Northwest Florida State College
 Pensacola State College
 Tallahassee Community College

Southern Conference
 Eastern Florida State College
 Miami Dade College
 Palm Beach State College
 Indian River State College

Suncoast Conference
 St. Petersburg College
 Polk State College
 Hillsborough Community College
 State College of Florida, Manatee–Sarasota
 Florida SouthWestern State College (formerly Edison Community College)
 South Florida State College

Independent
 Pasco–Hernando State College
 ASA College of Miami
 The College of the Florida Keys

Former Members
 Broward College
 Florida Gateway College (formerly Lake City Community College)
 North Florida Community College
 Valencia College (formerly Valencia Community College)

See also
 National Junior College Athletic Association (NJCAA)
 Florida College System Activities Association (FCSAA - the governing body of NJCAA Region 8)
 Florida College System
 NJCAA Region 9
 NJCAA Region 23

References

External links
 NJCAA official website
 FCSAA official website

College sports in Florida
National Junior College Athletic Association